Ernie Parkinson is a former Irish international lawn bowler.

Bowls career
He won a bronze medal in the fours at the 1986 Commonwealth Games in Edinburgh with Billie Montgomery, Willie Watson and Roy McCune.

Four years later he represented Northern Ireland in the pairs at the 1990 Commonwealth Games in Auckland, New Zealand.

He plays for the Belmont Bowling Club which he joined from the Ormeau Bowls Club.

References

Living people
Male lawn bowls players from Northern Ireland
Bowls players at the 1986 Commonwealth Games
Bowls players at the 1990 Commonwealth Games
Commonwealth Games bronze medallists for Northern Ireland
Commonwealth Games medallists in lawn bowls
Year of birth missing (living people)
Medallists at the 1986 Commonwealth Games